Margie Smith (born March 20, 1960, in Winnipeg, Manitoba) is an American curler from Shoreview, Minnesota. She is a former U.S. national senior women's champion.

Smith has played in eight national championships, coming closest to winning in her first event in 1987, where she lost in the final to Washington's Sharon Good. She has also curled in the 1991, 1994, 1998, 2000, 2006, 2009 and 2011 U.S. women's championships.

While never winning the women's nationals, Smith did win the women's senior national championship in 2011. This qualified her and her team of Debbie Dexter, Rachel Orvik, and Sally Barry to represent the United States at the 2011 World Senior Curling Championships. They finished the round robin in second place with an 8–2 record, but they lost both their semi-final match and the bronze medal match, forcing them to settle for 4th place.

On top of her other successes, Smith also won the 2007 U.S. club national championship.

External links
 
 Margie Smith on the United States Curling Association database

1960 births
Living people
Curlers from Winnipeg
American female curlers
Canadian expatriate sportspeople in the United States
21st-century American women